Gritzer See is a lake of Tyrol, Austria.

Lakes of Tyrol (state)
Venediger Group
Geography of East Tyrol